"Skyfire Cycle" is the eighth episode of the fourth season of the American television police sitcom series Brooklyn Nine-Nine. It is the 76th overall episode of the series and is written by David Phillips and directed by Michael McDonald. It aired on Fox in the United States on November 29, 2016.

The show revolves around the police precinct which is commonly referred to as the 99th precinct of the New York Police Department in Brooklyn and the officers and detectives that work in the precinct. In the episode, Jake and Terry help D.C. Parlov, an author of a popular book series called the Skyfire Cycle, to find the person who sends him death threats. Meanwhile, Holt and Kevin get into a conflict about a math puzzle.

The episode was seen by an estimated 2.34 million household viewers and gained a 1.0/3 ratings share among adults aged 18–49, according to Nielsen Media Research. The episode received very positive reviews from critics, who praised the cold open, writing, and Terry Crews' performance in the episode.

Plot
Jake (Andy Samberg) finds that a nearby precinct has the case of D.C. Parlov (Fred Melamed), author of the popular Skyfire Cycle book series. When Terry (Terry Crews) reveals to be a big fan whom Parlov sent advice on a book years ago, Jake has the case assigned to them so he can meet Parlov. However, Scully (Joel McKinnon Miller) advises Terry "not to meet his heroes".

Jake and Terry meet with Parlov, who states he's received death threats. While searching for suspects, Jake finds evidence that Parlov may have sent the threats to himself, as the letters on the threats and Terry's advice are the same. When they confront Parlov, he states that he didn't write the advice to Terry, as his assistant did. This depresses Terry, as the advice served as an inspiration for him. Jake goes to find the assistant, who tries to escape. However, Terry arrives and barricades him.

Meanwhile, Holt (Andre Braugher) and Kevin (Marc Evan Jackson) get into a discussion about the Monty Hall problem. After Amy (Melissa Fumero) says Kevin is right, this causes a fight between them. Seeing no solutions, Rosa (Stephanie Beatriz) tells Holt that the night shift has led to them not seeing each other enough and suggests them to have sex, upsetting him. However, the next day, Holt shows up in a good mood after having sex. Also, now that she's involved with the Boyles, Gina (Chelsea Peretti) has to suggest the family vacation destination. While Boyle (Joe Lo Truglio) wants Iowa, Gina suggests Aruba, managing to convince the Boyles. However, this earned her a place in the Boyle graveyard, much to her dismay.

Reception

Viewers
In its original American broadcast, "Skyfire Cycle" was seen by an estimated 2.34 million household viewers and gained a 1.0/3 ratings share among adults aged 18–49, according to Nielsen Media Research. This was a 6% increase in viewership from the previous episode, which was watched by 2.19 million viewers with a 0.9/3 in the 18-49 demographics. This means that 1.0 percent of all households with televisions watched the episode, while 3 percent of all households watching television at that time watched it. With these ratings, Brooklyn Nine-Nine was the highest rated show on FOX for the night, beating Scream Queens and New Girl, sixth on its timeslot and eleventh for the night, behind The Real O'Neals, Fresh Off the Boat, a rerun of NCIS, The Flash, American Housewife, The Middle, Chicago Fire, The Voice, Rudolph the Red-Nosed Reindeer, and This Is Us.

Critical reviews
"Skyfire Cycle" received very positive reviews from critics. LaToya Ferguson of The A.V. Club gave the episode an "A" grade and wrote, "So something like Brooklyn Nine-Nine acknowledging that its lovable crew are still on the night shift feels like a big deal, even though it's technically just basic storytelling. Because the fact that they're still working night shift is a big deal; it affects the way they behave, the types of cases they get, and their relationship with their loved ones." Allie Pape from Vulture gave the show a 4 star rating out of 5 and wrote, "Sergeant Terry Jeffords is the closest thing the Nine-Nine has to a straight man, so he tends to get shafted in the plot shuffle. As Holt's character has gotten wackier with time, Terry has grown to be the primary voice nay-saying his co-workers' antics. Nonetheless, Terry Crews has proven himself to be one of the most eager-to-please comic actors I've ever seen, and he'll do just about anything for a laugh — from putting live animals on his head to busting through walls to flexing his pecs one at a time. It's always a pleasure to get a Terry-centric episode, few and far between as they may be, especially when it focuses on a preoccupation other than his wife and kids."

Alan Sepinwall of HitFix wrote, "That kind of predictability could have led to a flat episode, but instead it's emblematic of what's one of the season's best installments, if perhaps its least fancy. Nothing in 'Skyfire Cycle' tries to go outside the boundaries of what we've come to expect from Brooklyn Nine-Nine, but all of it's very well executed." Andy Crump of Paste gave the episode a 8.5 and wrote, "'Skyfire Cycle' is no different than 'Chocolate Milk,' or 'The Pontiac Bandit Returns,' except that, again, it features Holt in full bone mode (and later, Parlov, who we catch in the middle of a foursome with three young cosplaying women). Brooklyn Nine-Nines quality is of a consistent standard. It's the individual jokes that make each chapter stand out, and sometimes, a man just has to get his bone on."

References

External links

2016 American television episodes
Brooklyn Nine-Nine (season 4) episodes